The 2019–20 Missouri State Lady Bears basketball team represented Missouri State University during the 2019–20 NCAA Division I women's basketball season. The Lady Bears, led by first year head coach Amaka Agugua-Hamilton, played their home games at JQH Arena and were members of the Missouri Valley Conference. They finished the season 26–4, 16–2 in MVC play to finish in first place.

The Missouri Valley Tournament and NCAA tournament was cancelled due to the COVID-19 outbreak.

Roster

Schedule

|-
!colspan=9 style=| Exhibition

|-
!colspan=9 style=| Non-conference regular season

|-
!colspan=9 style=| Conference Season

|-
!colspan=9 style=| Missouri Valley Women's Tournament

Rankings
2019–20 NCAA Division I women's basketball rankings

See also
 2019–20 Missouri State Bears basketball team

References

Missouri State Lady Bears basketball seasons
Missouri State
Missouri State, basketball women
Missouri State, basketball women